Máté Schmid (born 8 July 1996) is a Hungarian professional footballer who plays for Lombard-Pápa TFC.

Club statistics

Updated to games played as of 30 November 2014.

References

External links
MLSZ 
HLSZ 

1996 births
Living people
Footballers from Budapest
Hungarian footballers
Association football forwards
Lombard-Pápa TFC footballers
Nemzeti Bajnokság I players